Regan Ryzuk (born Regan Onufry Ryzuk, March 29, 1955, New York) is an American composer and pianist. Ryzuk is the son of renowned painter, Onufry Ryzuk and published author and playwright, Mary S. Ryzuk, PhD. He is the elder of two children.

Education
A graduate from Montville Township High School in Montville, New Jersey in 1973, Ryzuk studied with Robert Helps at Manhattan School of Music and attended The Juilliard School. Ryzuk's classical music studies led to jazz studies with Jaki Byard and Sir Roland Hanna. At Juilliard, he studied music theory and composition.

Career

Development as a composer 
During the 1980's, Ryzuk toured with various ballet companies – traveling through Europe and Latin America. This period enabled him to develop his improvisational techniques, which later laid the groundwork for one of his greatest compositional works,"48 Preludes and Fugues." Composed in the style Johann Sebastian Bach, Ryzuk developed "48 Preludes and Fugues" over the course of a year while living in Switzerland.

Upon his return to the United States in 1991, Ryzuk lived in New York and continued his compositional work. He developed a base of students, including Fountains of Wayne co-founder, Adam Schlesinger. Ryzuk periodically returned to Europe to study and develop compositions; for example he lived in Germany in 1994, where he wrote "Piano Fantasy in D♭," and made fairly frequent trip to London between 2000 and 2005 while writing a musical based on Jack the Ripper.

Around the year 2000 Ryzuk became a founding partner in a TV/film music production company known as SOUNDGUILD, which operated for approximately ten years.  Ryzuk's work from this period is featured in over 500 television and movie projects through his work with Zomba Music, including Kissing Jessica Stein, Chasing Papi, The Night Listener, 60 Minutes, and American Idol. He also provided music for Extreme Music Library, LTD.

Musicals and theater 
Ryzuk collaborated on a number of musicals with mother Mary S. Ryzuk, including some of Grimm's Fairy Tales and a full-length, fully orchestrated musical based on the novel The Lodger. The musical was initially titled Jack the Ripper, then was changed to share the name of the novel The Lodger, before finally receiving in current title, "Hunt: A Musical Thriller."  Ryzuk also wrote the music and the book for Joe's Bar, with additional lyrics by Mary S. Ryzuk.

In about 1995, Ryzuk co-founded the theater company Enchanted Players, which operated until 2010. When the theater company moved to the Darress Theatre in Boonton, New Jersey in 2008, Ryzuk became Composer in Residence for the theater until the Enchanted Players became inactive.

Associated acts 
Grover Kemble
Ian David 
Emanuel Kallins
Barbara McCarthy
New Jersey Ballet
Carmen Artis
Rio Clemente
Cindy Lee

Awards and honors 
1980 Kean College Jazz Composition and Performance Award
2004-2005 Perry Awards for Joe's Bar - Outstanding Musical Direction, Outstanding Production of an Original Musical,

Education 
Manhattan School of Music
Juilliard School of Music
Studied Under: Jaki Byard, Steven Citron, Sir Roland Hanna, Robert Helps, Henry Rauch, Ernst Ulmer and Stanley Wolfe

Films 
Chasing Papi
Kissing Jessica Stein
The Night Listener

Partial List of Opus Numbers 

 Op. 1, Prelude in C Major (1969)
 Op. 2, 5 Preludes for Piano (1974)
 Op. 3, Etude In F Major Essay For 5 Players (1974; lost)
 Op. 4, Phase Quartet works and Midnight Madness - Ostentation- Seven Eleven- Vibes- Axis- Irrational Funk- Coalescence (1978; lost)
 Op. 5, Duologues For Piano & Drums, Tangent Freeze- Wind Chimes, Michele, Dancing Colors, In a Wheat Field, Grandmother's Rocking Chair, Waltz, and Lydian Play (1979)
 Op. 6, 10 Pieces For Children (lost),Trio Comprovisations, and Felicity- Elena (1979)
 Op. 7, Angularities (1980) 
 Op. 8, Arsis Atmospheres, Ballad Blue, Rollands Romp, and Elaine (1980)
 Op. 9, Amorphous Moment For Piano, Music For Flute and Piano, Brief Fantasy For Flute and Piano, Short Essay For String Quartet, and Games For Flute and Piano (1981)
 Op. 10, Chiaroscuro, Moment For String Quartet, Raindrops On The Water For Piano (1981)
 Op. 11, 6 Impromptus, Romanze For Strings, The Stress of Julliard, Parlour Intrigues For Violin and Piano, Brief Fantasy For Clarinet and Piano, and Shadows For Clarinet and Piano (1981)
 Op. 12, Toccatina, 2 Short Pieces For Wind Quartet, Air For Clarinet, Pulse, Darkness For Piano, Tango, Sunshower, Swingerphism, Anabasis (1981 / 1982)
 Op. 13, Grand Grand Russian Fairytale For Two Pianos, Several Waltzes For Piano, Adagios For Piano, and 3 Mazurkas For Piano (1983)
 Op. 14, Etude In D# Minor, Scratch Counterpoint, At The Barre Again, Struggle On The Ivories, Tango Under The Fireworks (1984)
 Op. 15, Piano Fantasy In Db Major- Choreographed by Graziela Kozak (1985)
 Op. 16, Peridance Rag (1985)
 Op. 17, Lyric Setting For Winds and Strings (1985)
 Op. 18, Veil Of Dawn- Choreographed by Igal Perry (1986)
 Op. 19, String Quartet Miniatures and 4 Preludes For Piano Bb Major, C# Minor E Minor, C Minor (1987)
 Op. 20, 3 Mazurkas For Piano More Adagios For Piano (1988)
 Op. 21, Prothalamion No. 1 In Db Major…..(4 Hands on 1 Piano) and The Fifth Wife- A Musical song contribution and Pas de deux- Choreographed by Igal Perry (1989)
 Op. 22, 48 Preludes & Fugues (1990)
 Op. 23, Fantasy For Flute and Piano (1991)
 Op. 24, The Devil & The Three Golden Hairs, Fortune's Favorite (1993)
 Near You-
 Good-bye Fortune's Favorite
 The Letter
 The Forest
 Sound The Wedding Bells
 Three Golden Hairs
 Meeting The Watchman
 The Devil's Song
 Finale 
 Op. 25, Rapunzel: Full-Length Musical (1994)
 What's A Fairytale?
 If Only
 I Think I'll Die
 If I Steal 
 Am I so Scary, Then?
 Rapunzel 
 Come Sing With Me
 A Prince Of A Guy
 Was That A Dream I Heard?
 Let Down Your Hair
 What Is A Man?
 My Prince, My Love, My Own
 Miracle Of Love 
 Like Me, Like You 
 Finale
 Op. 26, Hansel & Gretel: Full-Length Musical
 We Get Along 
 Bringing Famine
 Come Play With Me 
 Thanksgiving Dinner
 There's A Wicked Witch
 Who's That?
 Abandoning The Children
 We Must Leave Them
 The Forest 
 Why Are We Alone?
 Fly Beautiful Bird
 Who Is Nibbling On My House?
 Help Yourself
 Run For Your Life
 Don't Be Afraid
 What Sweet Children
 We Must Be In Heaven
 Op. 27, 3 Barcarolles (1994)
 Op. 28, Sleeping Beauty: Full-Length Musical (1995)
 Royalty Does Not Guarantee
 Useless
 Maybe A Wish
 Magic
 The Princess Rose Lullaby
 Sisters Are We
 The Threat
 The Gifts 
 The Curse
 All The Spindles
 Take Heart
 Briar Rose
 Merry Maid
 The Seduction
 I've Won
 The Prince And The Hedge
 While You Sleep
 Grow Briar Hedge, Grow
 The Legend Of Briar Rose
 Beware Sweet Prince
 That's What Dreams Are Made Of
 Another Curse
 Finale
 Op. 29, Spy City (1995)
 Spy City 
 10 Original Big Band Charts Manhattan On The Rocks
 Crosstown Caper
 Dame With A Twist 
 Private Dick
 Night Beat
 In Pursuit
 City Of Desire
 Op. 30, Etude in Bb Major (1996)
 Op. 31, Little Red Riding Cap: Full-Length Musical (1996)
 These Dark Forbidding Woods
 Sweet Little Maid
 Little Red Riding Cap
 My Own Private Song
 The Big Bad Wolf
 Catching The Wolf 
 The Wolf's Song
 A Visit To Granny
 Don't Stray From The Path
 It's Off To Granny's House 
 All For Me
 The Forest Sequence
 Flowers, Lovely Flowers
 I'll Take This Road
 I'll Fool The Little Girl
 What Big Ears You Have 
 The Rescue
 Getting Away
 Finale
 Op. 32, Rumpelstiltskin: Full-Length Musical (1997)
 Tiny Town 
 I'm Somebody
 King Special's Song
 Always Boasting
 Poor Lass
 Lass Lament
 What Will You Give Me?
 Spinning Gold Sequence
 Avarice
 Give Me Your Child
 The Wedding
 Names
 Rumpelstiltskin
 Op. 33, Snow White & Rose Red: Full-Length Musical (1998)
 Heigh Ho Night Song 
 Wake Up
 Fantasy Of Dreams
 A Little Warmth
 Spare My Life
 We'll Never Play Rough Again
 Wake Up
 Searching
 If Only You Could
 Please Don't Cry
 Gathering Berries
 The Gnome Sequence
 Don't Do It
 Peace, Be Here
 Gnome's Fury
 Finale
 Op. 34, Jack The Ripper: Full-Length Musical Fully orchestrated (1999)
 Op. 35, Making Snow, A Short Christmas Musical Christmas Eve Dinner, I'll Try To Stay Up For Santa, A Letter To Santa, Making Snow, Vocal Fugue 2000, and Only The Beauty Remains
 Op. 36, Trios for Oboe Bass & Piano, Birth Of A Child: an Art Song for Voice and Piano (2001)
 Op. 37, The Pied Piper: A Short Children's Musical, Aubade No.1 (2001)
 Op. 38, Endless Ages For Orchestra (2003)
 Op. 39,  Barcarolle No. 4, 6 Mazurkas For Piano, Waltz For Piano, 6 Lyricisms For Piano (2005)
 Op. 40, Joe's Bar: Full-Length Musical- Music / Lyrics Jazz Quartet Arrangement, Joe's Bar: Full-Length Musical (2005)
 She's So Beautiful
 I Like You
 To Me
 Now And Then
 I Want
 Love's A Kick In The Pants
 Drinks
 Midnight In N.Y.
 Quitin' Time
 Just One Girl
 Maybe It's Me 
 Why Doesn't He Call?
 Let Songs Fill Your Mind
 Hangover Blues
 Men
 Women
 All I know
 Should We Try
 Op. 41, Regan Ryzuk Septet: New Concepts (2007)
 Storm In The Desert
 Subterfugue
 Light Musik
 Mideast Rest
 Sharing Three Thoughts
 Be Bop To Go
 A Dubious Cafe In Dubai
 Unfamiliar Territory
 Op. 42, Prothalamion No. 2 In Gb Major For Violin, Cello and Piano 20 Lyricisms For Piano Opus 43 2010 Standards Music and Lyrics, Tip Top, That Look, In A Lonesome Mood, Come On -My Dream, No Mystery To Me, Blue Sunday, Tell Me That You Love Me, Lovely Together, Love Song, and Stay (2009)
 Op. 44, 3 Sonatas (2008)

 Sonata No. 1 1st Mvt ("Fanfare")
 Sonata No. 1 2nd Mvt ("First Love")
 Sonata No. 1 3rd Mvt ("The Magician")

 Op. 45, 3 Sonatas, (2008)

 Sonata No. 2 1st Mvt ("A Night Carnival")
 Sonata No. 2 2nd Mvt ("March In The Gulag")
 Sonata No. 2 3rd Mvt ("Ostinato")

 Op. 46, 4 Sonatas (2009)

 Sonata No. 3 1st Mvt ("A Winter Sleighride")
 Sonata No. 3 2nd Mvt ("Surviving Hell")
 Sonata No. 3 3rd Mvt ("The Busy Anthill")
 Sonata No. 3 4th Mvt ("A Heroes Welcome")

 Op. 47, 3 Sonatas (2009)

 Sonata No. 4 1st Mvt ("Dance Of The Gladiators")
 Sonata No. 4 2nd Mvt ("After Rain On A Lake")
 Sonata No. 4 3rd Mvt ("The Determined Matador")

 Op. 48, 3 Sonatas (2009)

 Sonata No. 5 1st Mvt ("A Walk Through An Old Garden")
 Sonata No. 5 2nd Mvt ("The Haunted Library")
 Sonata No. 5 3rd Mvt ("Fountains")

 Op. 49, 3 Sonatas (2010)

 Sonata No. 6 1st Mvt ("The Victorious Warrior")
 Sonata No. 6 2nd Mvt ("Great Expectations")
 Sonata No. 6 3rd Mvt ("Dragonflies On A Lake")

Epi-Cycles Beyond The Kuiper Belt (A Fugue For Large String Orchestra)

 Op. 50, 4 Sonatas (2010)

 Sonata No. 7 1st Mvt ("A Silent Film")
 Sonata No. 7 2nd Mvt ("The Relentless Clock")
 Sonata No. 7 3rd Mvt ("A Ride In The Country")
 Sonata No. 7 4th Mvt ("The Cat And The String")

 Op. 51, 4 Sonatas (2010)

 Sonata No. 8 1st Mvt ("Children At Play")
 Sonata No. 8 2nd Mvt ("A Nursery Rhyme")
 Sonata No. 8 3rd Mvt ("A Piece Of String")
 Sonata No. 8 4th Mvt ("Journey Of The Monarch")

 Op. 52, 2 Sonatas (2010)

 Sonata No. 9 1st Mvt ("Strolling Through A Gallery")
 Sonata No. 9 2nd Mvt ("The Walk Along Lake Louise")

 Op. 53, 4 Sonatas (2010)

 Sonata No.10 ("A Comfortable Nightmare")
 Sonata No. 1 1st Mvt ("Fanfare")
 Sonata No. 1 2nd Mvt ("First Love")
 Sonata No. 1 3rd Mvt ("The Magician")

 Op. 54, The Bridge At Vladivostok: a One-Movement Symphonic Work (2012)
 Op. 55, Piano Concerto 3 Mvts. For Piano and Full Orchestra (2013)
 Op. 56, Intelligent Designs For Piano- No. 1 Newspeak and Pectin: A Brief Fantasy For Orchestra (2013)

References

1955 births
Living people
Musicians from New York City
Manhattan School of Music alumni
Juilliard School alumni
American male composers
20th-century American composers
American classical pianists
American male pianists
20th-century American pianists
Montville Township High School alumni
People from Montville, New Jersey
Classical musicians from New York (state)
21st-century classical pianists
20th-century American male musicians
21st-century American male musicians
21st-century American pianists